PahlavanKoshi (also Romanized as PahlavānKoshī; also known as PahlavānKoshī-ye Bozorg and PahlevānKoshī-ye Kochac) is a village in Delvar Rural District, Delvar District, Tangestan County, Bushehr Province, Iran. At the 2010 census, its population was 1564, in 309 families.

References 

Populated places in Tangestan County